E57 may refer to:
 European route E57
 Nimzo-Indian Defense, Encyclopaedia of Chess Openings code
 A file format developed by ASTM International for storing  point clouds and images

 A German air raid siren